Pyongsul Li Airport is an airport near Tŏkhŭng-ni in Koksan, Hwanghae-bukto, North Korea. Pyŏngsul-li village was named after Tŏkhŭng-ni in 1982.

Facilities 
The airfield has a single grass runway 15/33 measuring 2900 x 141 feet (884 x 43 m).  It approximately 11 km northeast of Koksan Airport.

References 

Airports in North Korea
North Hwanghae